Saetia (pronounced SAY-shuh) is a New York City-based screamo band.  Their name originates from a misspelling of the Miles Davis track "Saeta", from his album Sketches of Spain. While relatively unknown during their initial existence, the band is now seen as one of the most critically lauded bands of the late-1990s screamo scene. Stewart Mason of AllMusic described their music as an "essential document" for fans of screamo.

History

1997–1999: Formation, Saetia and breakup 
Saetia initially formed in February 1997 when each of its members were attending New York University. The band had numerous members throughout its existence, with frequent changes in membership. The band's first bass player, Alex Madara, was affected by a severe allergic reaction which placed him into a coma for eight days, finally resulting in his death on December 14, 1998.

Their drummer, Greg Drudy, was the original drummer of the band Interpol prior to their current popularity. He operated the record label Level Plane, which was initially started so Saetia could release a 7-inch single to sell at shows. Other members of the band continued their musical careers in numerous outfits, some of them joining screamo bands such as Off Minor, Hot Cross and The Fiction, as well as the bands Errortype: Eleven and Instruction.

The group would eventually break up in October 1999. Saetia's final, posthumous single, "Eronel" (also a title of a Thelonious Monk composition) was released under the Witching Hour label in 2000. The single contains three songs recorded by Steve Roche and mixed by Pat Kenneally. In 2001, Level Plane issued A Retrospective, a discography album that compiles every recording the band has made, including recordings taken from one of the last shows the band played at ABC No Rio.

2016: Posthumous releases
In 2016, Secret Voice, the label of Touché Amoré vocalist Jeremy Bolm, released Collected, a two-disc, 180 gram vinyl set that includes every studio recording by the group. The tracks from the ABC No Rio also saw their own release in the form of a cassette titled Live At ABC No Rio Spring 1999, which was also released in 2016 through Secret Voice.

2022: Reunion

In April 2022, Saetia, consisting of Billy Werner, Jamie Behar,  Adam Marino, Colin Bartoldus, and Steve Roche, announced via Instagram that they rehearsed for the first time in 24 years. In November 2022, they played live at four locations in New York and Pennsylvania.

Band members
Billy Werner – vocals on all
Greg Drudy – drums on all
Jamie Behar – guitar on all
Adam Marino – guitar on Demo, Saetia 7", Saetia LP/CD
Alex Madara (deceased) – bass on Demo, Saetia 7"
Colin Bartoldus – bass on Saetia LP/CD, guitar on Eronel 7"
Steve Roche – bass on Eronel 7", guitar at final live performance before disbandment, drums for reunion 
Matt Smith – bass at final live performance before disbandment

Discography

Studio albums

Singles and EPs

Compilation albums

External links
Band Profile at Level Plane Records
Home page at Level Plane Records
Where to see what venues Saetia will be playing in November, 2022

References

American post-hardcore musical groups
Musical groups from New York City
American screamo musical groups
Musical groups established in 1997
Musical groups disestablished in 1999
Level Plane Records artists